Nordtjønnåsen is a neighbourhood in the city of Kristiansand in Agder county, Norway.  It is located in the borough of Vågsbygd and in the district of Vågsbygd.  The neighborhood is located in the northwestern corner of the district, south of Slettheia and west of Hasselbakken.

References

Geography of Kristiansand
Neighbourhoods of Kristiansand